Khairy Yasser Abdel Moneim Amr is a Jordanian Minister of Investment. He had served as minister from 11 October 2021 until 26 October 2022.

References 

Living people
21st-century Jordanian politicians
Government ministers of Jordan
Year of birth missing (living people)